Thomas Höltschl (born 30 April 1990) is an Austrian football midfielder who currently plays for USK Anif.

References

1990 births
Living people
Association football midfielders
LASK players
Austrian footballers